The men's doubles tournament at the 1987 US Open was held from September 1 to September 14, 1987, on the outdoor hard courts at the USTA National Tennis Center in New York City, United States. Stefan Edberg and Anders Järryd won the title, defeating Ken Flach and Robert Seguso in the final.

Seeds

Draw

Finals

Top half

Section 1

Section 2

Bottom half

Section 3

Section 4

External links
 Main draw
1987 US Open – Men's draws and results at the International Tennis Federation

Men's Doubles
US Open (tennis) by year – Men's doubles